The 1966 Gossage Cup was the 38th and final edition of the Gossage Cup, before it was rebranded to the Challenge Cup the following year. It was hosted by Zanzibar, and won by Kenya. It was played between September 24 and October 1.

Participants 
Four nations competed.

Group

Matches

References
International-Football.net
RSSSF.com
CECAFA Cup